Lecce nei Marsi is a comune and town in the province of L'Aquila in the Abruzzo region of Italy.

It is located near the Fucino Lake plain, in the Marsica.

References

Cities and towns in Abruzzo
Marsica